Fauna of Austria may refer to:
 List of birds of Austria
 List of mammals of Austria

See also
 Outline of Austria